The Vargem do Braço River (also known as Rio Vargem do Cedro and Rio Pilões) is a river of the state of Santa Catarina, Brazil.

Course

The Vargem do Braço River rises in the lushly-forested Serra do Tabuleiro State Park, a  protected area created in 1975.
The Serra do Tabuleiro, with altitudes above , is the largest mountain in the east-central portion of the state.
The river is the main source of water for the greater Florianópolis metropolitan region.
The river seems to have flowed north-northwest until quite recently, when a major tectonic event forced it to change its course. 
It now flows east-northeast to enter the Cubatão River near its mouth on the Atlantic Ocean.

See also
List of rivers of Santa Catarina
List of rivers of Brazil

References

Sources

Rivers of Santa Catarina (state)